Transient High-Energy Sky and Early Universe Surveyor (THESEUS) is a space telescope mission proposal by the European Space Agency that would study gamma-ray bursts and X-rays for investigating the early universe.  If developed, the mission would investigate star formation rates and metallicity evolution, as well as studying the sources and physics of reionization.

Overview 

THESEUS is a mission concept that would monitor transient events in the high-energy Universe across the whole sky and over the entirety of cosmic history. In particular, it expects to make a complete census of gamma-ray bursts (GRBs) from the Universe's first billion years, to help understand the life cycle of the first stars. THESEUS would provide real-time triggers and accurate locations of the sources, which could also be followed up by other space- or ground-based telescopes operating at complementary wavelengths.

The concept was selected in May 2018 as a finalist to become the fifth Medium-class mission (M5) of the Cosmic Vision programme by the European Space Agency (ESA). The other finalist was EnVision, a Venus orbiter. The winner, EnVision, was selected in June 2021 for launch in 2031.

The space observatory would study gamma-ray bursts (GRBs) and X-rays and their association with the explosive death of massive stars, supernova shock break-outs, black hole tidal disruption events, and magnetar flares. This can provide fundamental information on the cosmic star formation rate, the number density and properties of low-mass galaxies, the neutral hydrogen fraction, and the escape fraction of ultraviolet photons from galaxies.

Scientific payload 

The conceptual payload of THESEUS includes:
 Soft X-ray Imager (SXI), sensitive to 0.3-6 keV is a set of 4 lobster-eye telescopes units, covering a total field of view (FOV) of 1 sr with source location accuracy <1-2 arcmin.
 InfraRed Telescope (IRT), sensitive to 0.7-1.8 μm is a 0.7 m NIR telescope with 15x15 arcmin FOV, for fast response, with both imaging and moderate spectroscopic capabilities (R~400). Mass: 112.6 kg.
 X-Gamma ray Imaging Spectrometer (XGIS), sensitive to 2 keV-20 MeV, is a set of coded-mask cameras using monolithic X-gamma ray detectors based on bars of silicon diodes coupled with CsI crystal scintillator, granting a 1.5 sr FOV, a source location accuracy of 5 arcmin in 2-30 keV and an unprecedentedly broad energy band. Mass: 37.3 kg.

See also 
 Gamma-ray astronomy
 List of proposed space observatories
 X-ray astronomy

References 

Cosmic Vision
Gamma-ray telescopes
X-ray telescopes
Space telescopes
European Space Agency satellites